The Metapolitical Unitary Movement (Spanish: Movimiento Unitario Metapolítico) is a political party in Colombia. It is led by Regina Betancourt de Liska.

History 
The party was founded in 1977.

The party contested the 2022 Colombian parliamentary election but failed to win any seats.

References

See also 

 List of political parties in Colombia

Political parties established in 1977
1977 establishments in Colombia